Mohammed Sajid, born November 9, 1948, in Settat, Morocco, to Berber parents from Taroudant, is a Moroccan businessman and politician.  He is the president of the Council of the urban municipality of Casablanca and deputy of the constituency of Taroudant-Chamalia on behalf of Constitutional Union. His brother, El-Mostafa Sajid, is the president of the Moroccan Association of Textile and Clothing Industries (AMITH).

References

Moroccan businesspeople
Moroccan politicians
1948 births
Living people